What Are You Waiting For? may refer to:

Albums
 What Are You Waiting For? (FM Static album), 2003
 What Are You Waiting For? (Krezip album), 2005
 What Are You Waiting For, a 2012 album by Jiro Wang

Songs
 "What Are You Waiting For?" (The Saturdays song), 2014
 "What Are You Waiting For?" (Nickelback song), 2014
"What Are You Waiting For?", a single by Dane Rumble from the 2010 album The Experiment
"What Are You Waiting For", a song written by Gary Lightbody
"What Are You Waiting For", a 1997 single by Phajja
"What Are You Waiting For?", a single by The Tides from the 2007 album One for the Man Over There
"What Are You Waitin' For", song by Montrose (written by Dan Hartman) from Jump on It
"What Are You Waiting For?", a single by Lauri Ylönen from New World
"What Are You Waiting For", a song by Tantric from Mind Control
"What Are You Waiting For", a single by Nailpin
"What Are You Waiting For?", a song by Hunters & Collectors from album What's a Few Men?
"What Are You Waiting For?", a song by Karine Polwart from Faultlines
"What Are You Waiting For?", a song by The Sick-Leaves
"What Are You Waiting For?", a song by Brigade from Come Morning We Fight
"What Are You Waiting For?", a song by Kathleen Edwards from Back to Me
"What Are You Waiting For?", a song by Miranda Cosgrove from Sparks Fly
"What Are You Waiting For", a song by The Saints from Everybody Knows the Monkey
"What Are You Waiting For", a song by Emmelie from Only Teardrops
"What Are You Waiting For", a song by Mai Kuraki from Perfect Crime
"What Are You Waiting For?", a song by Sherwood from QU
"What Are You Waiting For", a song by ATB from Contact
"What Are You Waiting For", a song by Evelyn King from I'm in Love
"What Are You Waiting For", a song by Phantom Planet from Raise the Dead
"What Are You Waiting For?", a song by No Secrets from No Secrets
"What are you Waiting For?", a song by Fair Ground
"What Are You Waiting For?", a song by Tupelo Honey
"Ti perimenis?" ("What Are You Waiting For"), a Greek song by Antonis Remos from the 2005 album San Anemos
"What Are You Waiting For?", a song by Disturbed from the 2015 album Immortalized

See also
"What R U Waiting 4", a 2004 song by Tiffani Wood, covered by Lindsay Lohan and Natalie Grant
"Mistanie Eiy" (song) ("What Are You Waiting For"), an Arabic song by Amal Hijazi
What You Waiting For? (disambiguation)